Outsourcing of animation has become widespread. Starting in the mid-1960s, the animation for many low-budget American animated productions has been done by animation studios in foreign countries such as Japan, South Korea, Taiwan, Hong Kong, Canada, Australia, the Philippines, India, and Hungary. This is done to lower the cost of animation production.

The earliest known example of animation outsourcing is Rankin/Bass Productions. Their stop-motion Animagic productions were headed by Japanese stop-motion animator Tadahito Mochinaga at his studio, MOM Production. Nearly all of the Rankin/Bass' traditional animation was outsourced to at least five Japanese animation companies: MOM Production, Toei Animation, TCJ (Television Corporation of Japan), Mushi Production and Topcraft. Hanna-Barbera was another early example of animation outsourcing; In 1978, Taiwan's Wang Film Productions (originally known as Cuckoo's Nest Studio) was founded as an overseas facility for the studio. In 1988, Hanna-Barbera also started a subsidiary in the Philippines, Fil-Cartoons.

Many entertainment giants such as The Walt Disney Company and IMAX are beginning to outsource an increasing amount of their animation production to Asian countries, particularly India, while other companies are outsourcing animation from India for commercials and computer games. A factor making India an outsourcing destination for animation films is its vast base of English speaking workforce. Animation, which requires understanding of the English language in order to lip-sync the animated media to the audio dialogue, benefits from this particular talent that the Indian workforce possesses. A number of animation companies in the country are also creating skilled manpower for the animation market through various training programs.

Overall though, the main reason why foreign entertainment firms are flocking to India is the cost advantage the country offers. As an example, American animators can cost about $125 an hour; in India, they cost $25 an hour. The total cost for making a full-length animated film in America is estimated to be $100 million to $175 million. In India, it can be made for $15 million to $25 million. Studios in India are also able to provide a large supply of low-cost, high-quality software engineers, even going so far as to establish studios outfitted with state-of-the-art hardware and software to carry out production overseas.

The Walt Disney Company has outsourced a number of major animation projects to studios throughout India. Cable and satellite station Cartoon Network is buying animation films made in South Korea while MTV has added India to its outsourcing center along with the Philippines and South Korea. Applied Gravity, a multimedia company in New Zealand, has outsourced almost 90% of it animation work to Satyam Computer Services’ business process outsourcing subsidiary, Nipuna Services. An animatronics dog for the Discovery Channel’s Animal Planet from popular episode called “K9 to11” and animatronics models for New Zealand theme parks were some of the best-known creations of Applied Gravity in India.

References

Animation
Animation